Warren E. Dixon is a control theorist and a professor in the Department of Mechanical and Aerospace Engineering at the University of Florida. He has served as the chair of the department since 2021.

Bibliography

References

External links 
 Nonlinear Controls and Robotics at the University of Florida

Control theorists
Living people
Year of birth missing (living people)